Walden D. Erickson (September 3, 1902 – December 1968) was a professional football player who played in the early National Football League as well as in Red Grange's American Football League. He played only two seasons of professional football.

Erickson attended the University of Washington. After college, he made his professional debut in the AFL with the Los Angeles Wildcats. When the AFL folded at the end of the season, Erickson took his act to the NFL, playing for the Pottsville Maroons.

1902 births
1968 deaths
Players of American football from Seattle
American football tackles
Washington Huskies football players
Los Angeles Wildcats players
Pottsville Maroons players